The name Mohamed Juma, or Juma'a, may refer to:

 Mohamed Juma (footballer), Bahraini footballer
 Mohamed Juma Al Shamisi, UAE entrepreneur
 Mohamed Juma Aldoy, Bahraini ice hockey player
 Mohamed Juma Basheer, UAE football player
 Mohamed Juma Buamaim, UAE entrepreneur
 Mohamed Hassan Juma, Iraqi middle-distance runner
 Mohamed Habib Juma Mnyaa, Tanzanian politician (born 1955)
 Mohamed Sameer Juma Albulushi, Omani swimmer
 Mohamed Wajih Juma'a, Syrian opposition member

See also 
 Jum'a-Mohammad Mohammadi, Afghan government minister (died 2003)
 Juma Mohamed Ahmed Ali Gharib, UAE footballer (born 1989)